The Upton Scott House is a historic home in Annapolis, Anne Arundel County, Maryland, United States. It is a -story, rectangular brick house. The interior is lavish, and the house has sustained only minor alterations in the 20th century. The house was built for Dr. Upton Scott, the personal physician to the Royal Governor of the Province of Maryland, and is of the transitional Georgian style. The house was built by William Brown, and closely resembles Brown's house on the South River, now known as the London Town Publik House.

The Upton Scott House was listed on the National Register of Historic Places in 1975.

References

External links
, including photo from 1976, at Maryland Historical Trust
Historic American Buildings Survey (HABS) documentation, filed under 4 Shipwright Street, Annapolis, Anne Arundel County, MD:

Houses on the National Register of Historic Places in Maryland
Houses in Annapolis, Maryland
Georgian architecture in Delaware
Houses completed in 1762
Historic American Buildings Survey in Maryland
National Register of Historic Places in Annapolis, Maryland